The 2015–16 Maltese Premier League was the 101st season of the Maltese Premier League. The season began on 21 August 2015 and concluded on 30 April 2016. Hibernians were the defending champions, having won their 11th title the previous season.

The Maltese Premier League consisted of three rounds, for a total of 33 matches per team, with the first two rounds played between 21 August 2015 and 14 February 2016, and the third and final round played from 20 February to 30 April 2016. After the end of the second round, the points earned were halved.

Format
The format for the 2015–16 Maltese Premier League was the same as the previous season. First all teams meet twice in a round-robin format for a total of 22 matches. After the two first rounds all teams advanced to a second phase where half of the points from the first two rounds were carried over and teams played each other once. These rules were changed before the previous season after a decision not to split the teams for a championship round and relegation round.

Venues

Teams and stadiums

Pietà Hotspurs and Żebbuġ Rangers were relegated after they finished eleventh and twelfth, respectively, the previous season. Pembroke Athleta, the 2014–15 First Division champion, made their debut in the Premier League. Runner-up St. Andrews returned to the highest level for the first time since the 1993–94 season.

Source: Scoresway

First round

League table

Results (matches 1–22)

Second round
All teams advanced to the second round. Teams kept their records from the first round, but their points from the first round were halved and rounded. Teams played each other once.

League table

Results (matches 23–33)

Relegation play-offs
A play-off match took place between St. Andrews, the tenth-placed team from the Premier League and Senglea Athletic, the third-placed team from the First Division for a place in the 2016–17 Maltese Premier League.

Top goalscorers

Source: MFA

References

External links
 MaltaFootball.com website
 Premier League at uefa.com
 Premier League at soccerway.com

Maltese Premier League seasons
Malta
1